Lubok (Russian: Лубок) is a class of Russian popular prints, characterized by simple graphics and generally a narrative goal.

Lubok may also refer to:
 Lubok, a former Dutch name for Bawean, an island in Indonesia
 Lubok, Johor, a mukim (parish) in Malaysia